Katherine Bellingham (born 1963) is an English engineer and television presenter known for her role presenting the BBC1 science show Tomorrow's World from 1990–1994. Following a period pursuing other interests and raising children, she resumed her broadcasting career in 2010.

Early life
Bellingham was born in Buckrose, East Riding of Yorkshire, and educated at the independent Mount School in York, followed by the Oxford University, where she studied Physics. She graduated in 1984. She earned her MSc in Electronic Communications Systems Engineering from University of Hertfordshire.

Career

Broadcasting
Bellingham was a BBC radio engineer working in the BBC Broadcasting House in 1988 when she was selected to co-host the annual Faraday Lecture sponsored by the Institution of Electrical Engineers – a tour of live shows for school pupils around the UK. A BBC Schools producer saw her perform and she was offered a presenting role on a new Design and Technology programme called Techno.

She returned to her engineering training, but then applied for Tomorrow's World and joined the team of presenters working on the show in 1990 for four years.

Programmes she has presented include:
 Radio Five Live – The Acid Test from 1994–7 and Splitting the Difference in 1996
 BBC School Radio
 Radio 4 – Testing Times (four-part series in November 1999)
 BBC2 – Working in Engineering in 1999
 The Open University
 Children's ITV – The Big Bang from 1996–2004

After around five years of regular television work, hosting numerous live events and presenting corporate video programmes, Bellingham decided to focus first on her young family and then to follow her core professional interest by returning to university to secure an MSc in Electronics.

Promotion of engineering (especially for women)
She trained and then worked as a maths teacher until July 2007, but has returned to media work, and to promoting STEM (science, technology, engineering and maths) to general public audiences, particularly school pupils. She is the DCSF's STEM Careers Champion (NSCC), Education Ambassador for the Bloodhound Engineering Adventure. Bellingham returned to TV screens in March 2010 as a regular co-presenter for Museum of Life a documentary series for BBC2 about the Natural History Museum. She was one of the celebrity judges at the National Science + Engineering Competition at The Big Bang Fair in March 2012, which rewards students who have achieved excellence in a science, technology, engineering or maths project and awarded prizes for the Talent 2030 National Engineering Competition for Girls in 2015.

She was also involved with the British Engineering Excellence Awards (BEEAs) in October 2010, an event, organised by British-based Eureka and New Electronics, which aims to promote the engineering achievements of British companies. During the awards Kate wore the "e-dress" (designed by Abigail Williams from Amman Valley School and created by Francesca Rosella and Ryan Genz of CuteCircuit), discussed the role of Design Technology (DT) in schools and its significance to British Engineering in the future.

Awards
In 1997, she received an honorary doctorate in Technology from Staffordshire University. In 2003, she received an MSc in Electronics from the University of Hertfordshire. She is President of Young Engineers, the national network of engineering clubs in schools and colleges. She is also a Patron of WISE, a charitable organisation that encourages young women to pursue careers in Science, Engineering and Construction.

In 2011 she was awarded a Women of Outstanding Achievement Award, partly in recognition for her work as National STEM Co-Ordinator for Sheffield Hallam University's Centre for Science Education.

Personal life
Bellingham is married to BBC maintenance engineer, Martin Young. They have two children and settled in Hertfordshire.

References

External links
 Kate Bellingham's Official Website
 Her Agent
 
 Science: So what?
 Young Engineers
 Receiving a Silver Medal from the Royal Academy of Engineering in June 2004.

News items
 Bloodhound SSC in November 2009

Audio clips
 Today programme in September 2008
 Shifting Load at Radio 4 in 2004

Video clips
 Tomorrow's World 15 April 1994 from the BBC Archive

1963 births
Living people
English television presenters
British women television presenters
BBC Radio 5 Live presenters
Mathematics popularizers
People associated with the Open University
British women engineers
Engineers from Yorkshire
Mathematics educators
Schoolteachers from Yorkshire
Alumni of the University of Hertfordshire
People from York
People educated at The Mount School, York
21st-century women engineers
British radio presenters
British women radio presenters